Tuscan regional election of 1985 took place on 12 May 1985.

Electoral law 
Election was held under proportional representation with provincial constituencies where the largest remainder method with a Droop quota was used. To ensure more proportionality, remained votes and seats were transferred at regional level and calculated at-large.

Results
The Italian Communist Party was by far the largest party. After the election Gianfranco Bartolini, the incumbent Communist President of the Region, formed a new government with the support of the Italian Socialist Party and the Italian Democratic Socialist Party.

Source: Ministry of the Interior

References

1985 elections in Italy
1985 regional election
1985
May 1985 events in Europe